

Box office collection 
The list of highest-grossing Malayalam films released in 2022, by worldwide box office gross revenue, are as follows:

January–March

April–June

July–September

October–December

References

External links 
 Malayalam Upcoming Releases

2022
Lists of 2022 films by country or language
 2022